The Royal Spanish Academy (generally abbreviated as RAE) is Spain's official royal institution with a mission to ensure the stability of the Spanish language. It is based in Madrid, Spain, and is affiliated with national language academies in 22 other Hispanophone nations through the Association of Academies of the Spanish Language.

The RAE dedicates itself to language planning by applying linguistic prescription aimed at promoting linguistic unity within and between various territories, to ensure a common standard. The proposed language guidelines are shown in a number of works.

History

The Royal Spanish Academy was founded in 1713, modeled after the Accademia della Crusca (1582), of Italy, and the Académie Française (1635), of France, with the purpose "to fix the voices and vocabularies of the Spanish language with propriety, elegance, and purity". King Philip V approved its constitution on 3 October 1714, placing it under the Crown's protection.

Its aristocratic founder, Duke of Escalona and Marquess of Villena, described its aims as "to assure that Spanish speakers will always be able to read Cervantes" – by exercising a progressive up-to-date maintenance of the formal language.

The proposals of the Academy became the official norm in Spain by royal decree in 1844, and they were also gradually adopted by the Spanish-speaking countries in the Americas.
Since the establishment of the Association of Academies of the Spanish Language in 1951, the Spanish academy works in close consultation with the other Spanish language academies in its various works and projects. The 1999 Orthography was the first to be edited by the twenty two academies together.

The headquarters, opened in 1894, is located at Calle Felipe IV, 4, in the ward of Jerónimos, next to the Museo del Prado. The Center for the Studies of the Royal Spanish Academy, opened in 2007, is located at Calle Serrano 187–189.

Fundamentals 
According to Salvador Gutiérrez, an academic numerary of the institution, the Academy does not dictate the rules but studies the language, collects information and presents it. The rules of the language are simply the continued use of expressions, some of which are collected by the Academy. Although he also says that it is important to read and write correctly. 
Article 1 of the statutes of the Royal Spanish Academy, translated from Spanish, says the following:

Composition 

The numeraries (Spanish: Números) are elected for life by the other academicians. Each academician holds a seat labeled with a letter from the Spanish alphabet, although upper and lower case letters denote separate seats.

The Academy has included Latin American members from the time of Rafael María Baralt, although some Spanish-speaking countries have their own academies of the language.

Current members

Notable past academicians

 Niceto Alcalá-Zamora
 Vicente Aleixandre
 Dámaso Alonso
 "Azorín"
 Vicente Bacallar y Sanna
 Pío Baroja
 Jacinto Benavente
 Carlos Bousoño
 Manuel Bretón de los Herreros
 Camilo José Cela
 Miguel Delibes
 José Echegaray
 Wenceslao Fernández Flórez
 Gaspar Melchor de Jovellanos
 Antonio Machado
 Salvador de Madariaga
 Julián Marías
 Francisco Martínez de la Rosa
 Ramón Menéndez Pidal
 Armando Palacio Valdés
 José María de Pereda
 Benito Pérez Galdós
 Manuel José Quintana
 Gonzalo Torrente Ballester
 Juan Valera
 José Zorrilla

Publications 
Joint publications of the RAE and the Association of Academies of the Spanish Language
 Diccionario de la lengua española (Spanish Language Dictionary). The 1st edition was published in 1780, the 22nd edition in 2001 and the 23rd edition in 2014, which since 2001 can be consulted online for free as of October 2017 and was published in Spain and other Spanish-speaking countries to mark the tricentennial of the founding of the RAE.
 The Diccionario esencial de la lengua española (Essential Dictionary of the Spanish Language) was published in 2006 as a compendium of the 22nd edition of the Dictionary of the Spanish Language.
 Ortografía de la lengua española (Spanish Language Orthography). The 1st edition was published in 1741 and the latest edition in 2010. The edition of 1999 was the first spelling book to cover the whole Hispanic world, replacing the Nuevas normas de prosodia y ortografía (New Rules for Prosody and Spelling) of 1959.
 Nueva gramática de la lengua española (New Spanish Language Grammar, 1st edition: 1771, latest edition: 2009). The latest edition is the first grammar to cover the whole Hispanic world, replacing the prior Gramática de la lengua española (Grammar of the Spanish Language, 1931) and the Esbozo de una Nueva gramática de la lengua española (Outline of a New Grammar of the Spanish Language, 1973). The Nueva gramática de la lengua española is available in 3 different versions: The Edición completa (Complete Edition) includes 3,800 pages in two volumes to describe morphology and syntax (published December 4, 2009) plus a third volume of phonetics and phonology and a DVD (early 2010). 
 The Manual edition is a single 750-page volume, which was presented at the 5th Congress of the Spanish Language which convened virtually in Valparaíso, Chile, due to the earthquake, and was released on April 23, 2010. 
 The Gramática básica (Basic Grammar) is a 305-page volume directed to people who received secondary education, and which can be adaptable for school use; it was first published in 2011.
 The RAE has also published two other works by individual editors: Gramática de la lengua española (Grammar of the Spanish Language, by Emilio Alarcos Llorach, 1994) and Gramática descriptiva de la lengua española (Descriptive Grammar of the Spanish Language, 3 volumes, directed by Ignacio Bosque and Violeta Demonte, 1999).
 Diccionario panhispánico de dudas (Pan-Hispanic Dictionary of Doubts, 1st edition: 2005). Resolves doubts related to the use of the Spanish language. Can be consulted online since 2006.
 Diccionario del estudiante (Student's Dictionary, 1st edition: 2005). Directed to students in secondary education between 12 and 18 years-old. 
 Diccionario práctico del estudiante (Student's Practical Dictionary, 1st edition: 2007) is an adapted version for Latin America of the Student's Dictionary.
 Diccionario de americanismos (Dictionary of Americanisms) is a listing of Spanish language terms of the Americas and their meaning. First edition published in 2010.

See also 

 List of language regulators
 Paloma Chen

References

External links

  

1713 establishments in Spain
Bien de Interés Cultural landmarks in Madrid
Language regulators
Spain
Spain
Organizations established in 1713
S
Spanish language academies